Robert Douglas, 1st Viscount of Belhaven PC (1573 – 14 January 1639), was a Scottish courtier.

Family background
The second son of Malcolm Douglas of Mains (executed 1584), by Janet Cunningham, daughter of John Cunningham, of Drumquhassil.

Career
His older brother fought a duel with the brother of Oliver Leigh of Addington, who was avener of the royal stables, and was killed. Robert Douglas was given his brother's place at court, and became Master of the Horse to Prince Henry, a Gentleman of the Bedchamber to James VI and I and Charles I and Master of the Household to Charles I.

Douglas was sent with to France with a gift of horses in July 1607. He was knighted in 1609. He led the horse of state at Prince Henry's funeral in December 1612. In July 1616 he went to France with Lord Hay.

He was sworn of the Scottish Privy Council. In 1633, on the coronation of Charles I, he was raised to the Peerage of Scotland as Viscount of Belhaven, in the County of Haddington.

Family
Lord Belhaven married Nicola Moray, daughter of Robert Murray of Abercairny, in 1611. She died in childbed in November 1612. He had two children by his mistress, Elizabeth Whalley the sister of Edward Whalley, who was subsequently to be a regicide. They were both legitimised by Act of Parliament when he became a viscount at Charles I's coronation in 1633.

His son John is assumed to have predeceased him, but his daughter Susanna Douglas married her cousin, Robert Douglas of Blackerston. On his death, his estate including the Gorbals Mansion House passed to his nephew and son-in-law. Lord Belhaven died at Edinburgh in January 1639 and was buried in Holyrood Abbey in Edinburgh where his monument remains today. As he had no sons the viscountcy died with him.

References

External links
Portrait of Lord Belhaven at douglashistory.co.uk

1573 births
1639 deaths
Viscounts in the Peerage of Scotland
Members of the Privy Council of Scotland
Court of James VI and I
Burials at Holyrood Abbey
17th-century Scottish people
Place of birth missing
Scottish courtiers
Peers of Scotland created by Charles I